Ötkür Hesen (born 10 April 1993 in Yining City, Ili Kazakh Autonomous Prefecture, Xinjiang, China) is a Chinese professional association football player who currently plays for China League One side Sichuan Jiuniu.

Club career
After playing in the youth squad of Shandong Luneng Taishan, Ötkür started his professional football career in 2011. He played for Shandong Youth (Shandong Luneng youth team) in the China League Two and made 14 appearances in the season. Ötkür was promoted to Shandong Luneng's first team squad by Henk ten Cate in 2012. On 19 August 2012, Ötkür made his Super League debut in a 4–2 away defeat against Guangzhou R&F. However, after Shandong Luneng conceding three goals in the first half, he was substituted off by Du Wei in the 46th minute.
In January 2014, Ötkür was loaned to China League One side Hebei Zhongji until 31 December 2014. He made a permanent transfer to Hebei Zhongji in 2015. He was sent to the reserved team in 2016.

In February 2017, Ötkür transferred to China League One side Dalian Transcendence.

International career
Ötkür received his first called up for China U-20's squad by Su Maozhen in December 2010. He was appointed as the team captain and continued to play for U-20s in the 2011 Granatkin Memorial, 2011 Toulon Tournament, 2011 Weifang Cup. He made one appearance in the 2012 AFC U-19 Championship qualification (v Macau, 6 November 2011) as China U-20 qualified into the 2012 AFC U-19 Championship.

In March 2011, Ötkür received his first call up for China for the international friendly against Costa Rica. However, he didn't appear in the match.

Career statistics 
Statistics accurate as of match played 31 December 2020.

References

External links

1993 births
Living people
People from Ili
Chinese footballers
Uyghur sportspeople
Chinese people of Uyghur descent
Footballers from Xinjiang
Shandong Taishan F.C. players
Cangzhou Mighty Lions F.C. players
Hebei F.C. players
Dalian Transcendence F.C. players
Sichuan Jiuniu F.C. players
Chinese Super League players
China League One players
China League Two players
Association football defenders